John Joseph "John Joe" Nevin (born 7 June 1988), is an Irish professional boxer. He is a two-time Olympian, and a London 2012 silver medalist.

Early life
John Joseph Nevin was born in Mullingar, County Westmeath, and is a member of the Traveller community. He attended Scoil Mhuire CBS primary school in the town.

Amateur career

2008 | Olympic Games Qualifying Tournament
Nevin qualified for the 2008 Beijing Olympics by winning the first Olympic Qualifying Tournament in Italy.

2008 | European Union Amateur Championships
Nevin won the 2008 EU Amateur Championships in Cetniewo, Poland.

2008 | Olympic Games
At just 18 years of age, Nevin competed in Beijing at his first Summer Olympics. He beat Abdelhalim Ourradi 9–4 in his first round before being beaten by Badar-Uugan Enkhbatyn 9–2 in the round of 16. Enkhbatyn went on to win gold in the final.

2009 | World Amateur Championships
On 9 September 2009, Nevin guaranteed Ireland a historic sixth medal at the 2009 World Amateur Boxing Championships after he beat China's Yu Gu in Milan. He won his quarter-final 7–5.
In the semi-final he lost by 5–4 to Russian Eduard Abzalimov, and so took away a bronze medal.

2011 | World Amateur Championships
At the 2011 World Boxing Championships in Baku, Azerbaijan, Nevin reached the semi-finals after beating Orzubek Shaymov of Uzbekistan 19–17 in the quarter's. Nevin lost to Britain's Luke Campbell in the semi's through a very controversial countback, forcing him to settle for a second World Championship bronze medal. This however was more than enough to qualify Nevin for the 2012 London Olympics.

2012 | Olympic Games
Nevin won his first fight in London, defeating Denmark's Dennis Ceylan by a wide margin of 21–6. In his second fight of the games he saw off Kazakhstan's Kanat Abutalipov by a margin of 15–10. In his quarter-final bout he beat Oscar Valdez to secure a semi-final place and the guarantee of at least a bronze medal.

He reached the final after defeating the reigning bantamweight world champion Lázaro Álvarez of Cuba, 19–14. In the final however, Nevin lost 14–11 to Britain's Luke Campbell, winning a silver medal in the process. Nevin reportedly said that he wants his legacy from the Games to be "a closer relationship between Travellers and the settled community."

2013: European Amateur Championships
In June 2013 he won a gold medal at the 2013 European Amateur Boxing Championships in the Bantamweight division.

National Titles
In 2012, Nevin won his fifth straight national senior title, incidentally beating his cousin Michael Nevin 23-3 in the final. Nevin was unable to defend his national title in 2013 because he injured his wrist while sparring in the high performance, the title was taken by Declan Geraghty from Crumlin boxing club. That didn't stop the Irish Amateur Boxing Association from picking Nevin as their #1 choice for the 2013 European Boxing Championships being held in Minsk later that year.

Professional career
Having announced the previous year that he planned on turning professional, Nevin finally did so in 2013.
Speaking on 22 October, he said "This is the next step for me. I've done everything I wanted to do in the amateur business, if I could change the colour of the Olympic medal I would but that's done and now it's time to move on and hopefully bring back a world title to Ireland." Nevin signed a management deal with a business sports partnership that includes GreenBlood Boxing from Philadelphia and Berkley Sports & Media from London.

Nevin made his professional debut in a super featherweight bout on 17 March 2014 against Alberto Candelaria, winning by unanimous decision.

Personal life
He is married with two children.

Controversy 
Nevin has frequently attracted controversy through his involvement in several high profile public order incidents. In 2013, Nevin was arrested and charged following a drunken altercation with his father in a public street in Mullingar.

In 2015, Nevin was barred from every public house in his home town of Mullingar by court order, following a violent fracas.

Professional boxing record

References

External links
 World Juniors 2006 at amateur-boxing.strefa.pl
 First qualifier at amateur-boxing.strefa.pl
 
 
 

1989 births
Living people
AIBA World Boxing Championships medalists
Bantamweight boxers
Boxers at the 2008 Summer Olympics
Boxers at the 2012 Summer Olympics
Irish male boxers
Irish Traveller sportspeople
Medalists at the 2012 Summer Olympics
Olympic boxers of Ireland
Olympic medalists in boxing
Olympic silver medalists for Ireland
People from Mullingar
Sportspeople from County Westmeath
21st-century Irish people